Simón Pestana is a Venezuelan television actor known for portraying various characters in Venezuelan telenovelas, including Heriberto Madroño in the telenovela Entre tu amor y mi amor and Carlos Enrique Ibáñez in the telenovela Para verte mejor. He provided the voice of Simón Bolívar in the 2017 animated movie Pequeños héroes.

Filmography

References

External links 
 

Living people
Male actors from Caracas
Venezuelan male telenovela actors
Venezuelan male television actors
Year of birth missing (living people)